Omiodes pandaralis is a moth in the family Crambidae. It was described by Francis Walker in 1859. It is found in Brazil and Costa Rica.

References

Moths described in 1859
pandaralis